Manassas may refer to:

Places
Manassas, Virginia, a city in the United States; known in the 19th century as "Manassas Junction"
Manassas Airport, southwest of Manassas, Virginia
Manassas (Amtrak station), a railroad station
Manassas National Battlefield Park, the location of two major American Civil War battles:
First Battle of Bull Run (First Battle of Manassas), July 21, 1861
Second Battle of Bull Run (Battle of Second Manassas), August 28–30, 1862
Manassas Gap, a pass in the northern Blue Ridge Mountains of Virginia; the first entity to bear the name "Manassas"
Manassas, Georgia, United States, a small town

Other
Manassas (band), a 1970s rock band
 Manassas (album), the debut album by Manassas
CSS Manassas, a Confederate ironclad ram during the American Civil War
Manassas (novel), a novel by Upton Sinclair
Manassas (wargame), a 1973 board wargame

See also
Manassas Park, Virginia, a city adjacent to Manassas, Virginia
 Manasses (disambiguation)